SpeedTree is a group of vegetation programming and modeling software products developed and sold by Interactive Data Visualization, Inc. (IDV) that generates virtual foliage for animations, architecture and in real time for video games and demanding real time simulations.

SpeedTree has been licensed to developers of a range of video games for Microsoft Windows, and the Xbox and PlayStation console series since 2002.

SpeedTree has been used in more than 40 major films since its release in 2009, including Iron Man 3, Star Trek Into Darkness, Life of Pi and Birdman, and was used to generate the lush vegetation of Pandora, in Avatar.

SpeedTree was awarded a Scientific and Technical Academy Award in 2015, presented to IDV founders Michael Sechrest and Chris King, and Senior Engineer Greg Croft.

History
SpeedTree was conceptualized at IDV in circa 2000, and originated due to the firm's lack of satisfaction with 3rd-party tree-generation software on the market.

The initial version of SpeedTreeCAD (CAD standing for "computer-aided design") was developed by IDV for a real-time golf simulation.  Although backers pulled out of the golf project, IDV refined the CAD software as a 3D Studio Max plug-in for an animated architectural rendering, dubbing it SpeedTreeMAX.

SpeedTreeMAX was released in February 2002, and toward the end of 2002, IDV released SpeedTreeRT, a real-time foliage/tree middleware SDK, which allowed automatic levels of foliage detail, real-time wind effects, and multiple lighting options. IDV eventually released plug-ins for Maya as well, appropriately named SpeedTreeMAYA. In early 2009, IDV discontinued the SpeedTreeMAX and SpeedTreeMAYA plugins, replacing them with SpeedTree Modeler and Compiler products.

IDV released SpeedTree 5 in July 2009, a version representing a "complete re-engineering" of the software and the first versions of SpeedTree enabling hand modeling and editing of vegetation models: SpeedTree Modeler (replacing SpeedTreeCAD), SpeedTreeSDK (replacing SpeedTreeRT) and SpeedTree Compiler, which prepares SpeedTree files for real-time rendering.

SpeedTree Cinema was first released by IDV in 2009, based on version 5 technology. SpeedTree for Games (version 6) was released on November 7, 2011, and was essentially a re-branded version of SpeedTree 6 (Modeler + Compiler). The product was identified as SpeedTree for Games to distinguish it from other products not meant for gaming/real-time use.

SpeedTree Architect was released on October 15, 2012, and is designed for architectural 3D CAD use and 3D fly-throughs. IDV released updated versions of SpeedTree Cinema, SpeedTree Studio and SpeedTree Architect in November 2013. IDV released SpeedTree v7 for Unreal Engine 4 in July 2014. IDV released SpeedTree v7 for Unity 5 on the new engine version's launch date, in March 2015. IDV released SpeedTree for Games v7 on April 16, 2015.

IDV and three of its engineers received a Scientific and Technical Academy Award in 2015, for their SpeedTree Cinema product suite.

IDV was acquired by Unity Technologies in July 2021.

SpeedTree 9 was released on January 10, 2022. This version added new features such as freehand editing for branch bending. New branch features, zig-zag, jink, texture map skew correction can be found on the branch generator. Mesh Converter to help turn 3d trunk and branch scans into full tree models. Atlas control, HDRI lighting, USD export, material for backside of the leaf geometry

Products

Suites
SpeedTree Cinema was released by IDV in 2009, and saw its first major use in Avatar by James Cameron. SpeedTree Cinema is designed for use in the film industry, and generates high-resolution meshes and high-quality textures for Autodesk 3ds Max, Autodesk Maya and Cinema4D. The Cinema edition includes SpeedTree Modeler, and the complete Tree Model Library designed by IDV, while with some other suites tree packs must be purchased separately. Several members of the SpeedTree line can simulate animated growth of trees and plants and seasonal changes, and can export data for animated wind effects.

SpeedTree Studio was released by IDV in 2009 as a less expensive companion to SpeedTree Cinema. It does not include all Cinema features, nor the complete Tree Model Library.

SpeedTree Architect was released in 2012, is designed for use in 3D architectural CAD. It generates meshes compatible with typical architectural applications such as Autodesk 3ds Max, Autodesk Maya and Rhino. The Architect edition also exports normal maps and UV maps, for physically-accurate rendering engines such as V-Ray and mental ray.

SpeedTree for Games is the edition of SpeedTree for video game development, contrasting with the Subscription edition offered to users of the Unity game development engine and certain versions of the Unreal Engine 4 engine. The Games edition includes the Modeler, Compiler, and SDK. This edition permits game developers to integrate SpeedTree runtime technology into any game engine of their choice. Meshes generated with the system are low poly, with multiple levels of detail, use texture atlases, and are typically stored in an efficient binary format.

SpeedTree Subscription Edition is a low-cost edition of SpeedTree Modeler and Runtime, targeted at independent game studios. The licensing fee is a US$19 monthly charge, as well as additional charges for tree packs. Subscribers get access to the SpeedTree editor, the ability to generate 3D models of trees and plants, such plants being exclusively usable with either Unreal Engine 4 or Unity, depending on the license. Subscribers can download additional tree model packs from the Model Library, and pricing varies between packs.

Components
SpeedTree Modeler is a Windows-based specialized modeling tool for designing foliage. The modeler features a combination of procedural tree generation, and hand-editing tools, to draw trees or transform individual tree parts. Procedural tree generation uses configuration such as branch length, branching angles and bark texture to generate a tree in a variety of formats. Newer versions support a drag-and-drop interface that automatically blends branch intersections and handles branch collisions.

SpeedTree Compiler is a software that enables creation of efficient tree models for use in real-time rendering or video games. It generates texture atlases and compiles and optimizes tree models for real-time use.

SpeedTree SDK is a multi-platform C++ SDK that efficiently handles rendering of SpeedTree-generated trees and forests. The engine is designed to integrate and operate within a larger game engine, with ready-made support for Unreal Engine, Unity and OGRE. The engine contains optimized systems to cull off-screen trees, and to determine level of detail for on-screen trees. Full source code is available to licensees for use in video games and other real-time applications, and modification of the engine is supported. The engine is built to work with Microsoft Windows, Mac OS X, Xbox, PlayStation and PlayStation Vita.

Partners
IDV is a licensed middleware partner with PlayStation 3, PlayStation 4, Xbox 360 and Xbox One.

IDV has partnered with Epic Games in order to integrate the software with Epic's Unreal Engine 4 and Unreal Engine 3 and the free UDK engine released in November 2009. Partnerships have also been formed between IDV and BigWorld Tech, the Vision Engine by Havok, Multiverse Network, the Gamebryo engine by Emergent Game Technologies and the OGRE open-source rendering engine by Torus Knot.

Awards
 SpeedTree won a Scientific and Technical Academy Award in 2015. 
 SpeedTree was accorded a Primetime Emmy Engineering Award in October 2015.
 2015 Develop Industry Excellence Award Winner, in the Design & Creativity Tool category. Develop, a UK-based magazine and website serving the game industry, first recognized industry achievements in a variety of categories in 2003.
 2016 Develop Industry Excellence Awards Finalist, in the Design & Creativity Tool/Tech & Services category.
 2008 Develop Industry Excellence Awards Finalist, in the Technology & Services, Tools Providers category.
 2005 Frontline Award, Middleware category. This award program, sponsored by Game Developer magazine, recognizes exceptional game development tools.
 Frontline Award Finalist: 2003, 2004, 2006, 2009, 2012
 MT2 Top 100: 2003, 2004, 2005, 2006, 2008, 2010, 2011, 2012, 2013. The MT2 Top 100 awards are sponsored by Kerrigan Media International and Military Training Technology to recognize companies and technologies that have made a significant impact in the military training industry.

Applications

Video game industry
SpeedTree for Games was licensed for its first video games, including The Elder Scrolls IV: Oblivion, in December 2002.  SpeedTree has been licensed for PC and next-generation console titles in a wide variety of genres. Studios that have used SpeedTree, or published games featuring the technology, include:

 Activision
 Bethesda Softworks
 BioWare
 Blue Byte
 Bungie
 Capcom
 CD Projekt Red
 The Creative Assembly
 DICE
 Electronic Arts
 Epic Games
 FromSoftware
 Frontier Developments
 Funcom Productions
 Gearbox Software
 Hello Games
 Insomniac
 Koei
 Larian Studios
 Massive Entertainment

 Microsoft Game Studios
 Namco Bandai
 NCsoft
 Ninja Theory
 Obsidian Entertainment
 Epic Games Poland
 Piranha Bytes
 Rockstar Games
 Rocksteady Studios
 SEGA
 Sony Computer Entertainment
 Sony Interactive Entertainment
 Square Enix
 Sucker Punch
 Take-Two Interactive
 Tango Gameworks
 Ubisoft
 Volition
 Warner Bros.
 WEBZEN

Selected recent, upcoming and/or popular titles featuring SpeedTree for Games:

Film and animation industry
Following the release of SpeedTree Cinema in 2009, SpeedTree saw its first major cinematic use in 2009's Avatar, in which the technology provided the vegetation for the flyover of the planet Pandora in the first frames of the movie, as well as other scenes. Known movies and television productions featuring SpeedTree include:

Real-time applications
SpeedTree is being used in the following real-time projects and offerings:
America's Army project, both the America's Army game and in non-public applications used for training, simulation, education, virtual prototyping and outreach
An optional foliage module with the Vega Prime visualization product line. Vega Prime is a 3D visual simulation software package used by the global military industry and in other game and non-game markets.
An Apache attack helicopter FLIR simulation developed for the US Army by Camber Corp. for pilot training under night flying conditions
The Expresso Fitness Virtual Reality Bike, a cardio exercise system developed by Expresso Fitness and sold to gyms and home users
A combat simulation developed by Emergent Game Technologies for the US Department of Defense
A project under development by the Germany-based division of European Aeronautic Defence and Space (EADS)
The Forest Fire project, developed by the Media Convergence Laboratory (MCL) at the University of Central Florida. The project is helping to determine if a virtual reality presentation of wildfires can influence local residents to invest in prescribed burns and other protective efforts.

See also
Game engine

References

External links
 SpeedTree official website
 Interactive Data Visualization, Inc. Official Website - the website of the developers of SpeedTree.
 Gamasutra feature article on SpeedTree

2002 software
3D graphics software
Middleware for video games
Video game engines
Virtual reality